Parminder may refer to:
 Parminder Ghumman, Indian voice actor
 Parminder Nagra, English actress who starred in 2002 film Bend It Like Beckham
 Parminder Singh Dhindsa, Indian politician from Punjab
 Parminder Singh Dhull, Indian politician from Haryana
 Parminder Singh Saini, Indian skyjacker who immigrated to Canada